This article is a list of diseases of rhododendron (Rhododendron spp.).

Bacterial diseases

Fungal diseases

Nematodes, parasitic

Viral diseases

References 

 Common Names of Diseases, The American Phytopathological Society
 Diseases and pests of rhododendrons
  Images of diseases and pests of rhododendrons
Rhododendron
Rhododendron
Rhododendrons